The 1919 All-Western college football team consists of American football players selected to the All-Western teams chosen by various selectors for the 1919 college football season.

All-Western selections

Ends
 Paul Meyers, Wisconsin (FM, GB, HG, WE-1)
 Lester Belding, Iowa (FM, WE-1)
 Frank Weston, Wisconsin (HG, WE-2)
 Chuck Carney, Illinois (GB, WE-2) (CFHOF)

Tackles
 Charles Higgins, Chicago (FM, GB, HG, WE-1)
 Duke Slater, Iowa (FM, GB [guard], HG, WE-1) (CFHOF)
 Trygve Johnsen, Minnesota (GB)
 Burt Ingwersen, Illinois (WE-2)
 Angus Goetz, Michigan (WE-2)

Guards
 Clarence Applegran, Illinois (GB, WE-1)
 Lloyd Pixley, Ohio State (FM)
 William G. McCaw, Indiana (FM, WE-2)
 Iolas Huffman, Ohio State (HG)
 Lawrence O. Petty, Illinois (HG)
 Dick Barker, Iowa State (WE-1)
 Maurice J. "Clipper" Smith, Notre Dame (WE-2)

Centers
 Charles Carpenter, Wisconsin (FM, HG, WE-2)
 Williams, Minnesota (GB)
 Jack Depler, Illinois (WE-1)

Quarterbacks
 Gaylord Stinchcomb, Ohio State (FM, HG, WE-1) (CFHOF)
 Aubrey Devine, Iowa (GB) (CFHOF)
 Robert, Fletcher (WE-2)

Halfbacks
 Chic Harley, Ohio State (FM, GB, HG, WE-1) (CFHOF)
 Arnold Oss, Minnesota (FM, GB, WE-2)
 Leonard Bahan, Notre Dame (HG)
 George Gipp, Notre Dame (WE-1) (CFHOF)
 Laurie Walquist, Illinois (WE-2)

Fullbacks
 Jack Crangle, Illinois (FM)
 Lauer, Detroit (HG)
 Edmond R. Ruben, Minnesota (GB)
 Fred Lohman, Iowa (WE-1)
 John H. Hammes, Michigan Agricultural (WE-2)

Key
ECP = E. C. Patterson for Collier's Weekly

FM = Frank G. Menke

GB = George A. Barton, sporting editor of Minneapolis Daily News

HG = H. C. Garrison in Detroit Times

WE = Walter Eckersall in Chicago Tribune

CFHOF = College Football Hall of Fame

See also
1919 College Football All-America Team
1919 All-Big Ten Conference football team

References

1919 Big Ten Conference football season
All-Western college football teams